is a Japanese actress best known in the West for her role as the femme fatale in Branded to Kill movie (1967). Her sisters are model Prabha Sheth and actress Yuka Kumari. She is married to conductor Yoshikazu Fukumura.

Filmography

External links
 
 
 
 Yahoo Japan profile 

1948 births
Living people
20th-century Japanese actresses
21st-century Japanese actresses
Actresses from Tokyo
Japanese film actresses
Japanese people of Indian descent